The 1869 Ohio gubernatorial election was held on October 12, 1869. Incumbent Republican Rutherford B. Hayes defeated Democratic nominee George H. Pendleton with 50.74% of the vote.

General election

Candidates
Major party candidates
Rutherford B. Hayes, Republican 
George H. Pendleton, Democratic

Other candidates
Samuel Scott, Prohibition

Results

References

1869
Ohio
Rutherford B. Hayes